Te Awa is a suburb of the city of Napier, in the Hawke's Bay region of New Zealand's eastern North Island.

It consists of a mix of 1920s small railway workers' houses which survived the 1931 Hawke's Bay earthquake, Art Deco homes built during the 1960s and 1970s, and twenty-first century subdivisions.

Education
Te Awa has two schools:

Residents also use two other schools:

References

Suburbs of Napier, New Zealand
Populated places around Hawke Bay